Cidade Ademar is one of 96 districts in the city of São Paulo, Brazil.

See also
 Roman Catholic Diocese of Santo Amaro

References

External links
 Roman Catholic Diocese of Santo Amaro

Districts of São Paulo